49 Librae is the Flamsteed designation for a binary star system in the Zodiac constellation of Libra. It has an apparent visual magnitude of 5.47, making it faintly visible to the naked eye from dark suburban skies as a dim, yellow-white hued star. The system is located 95 light years away from the Sun, based on parallax, but is drifting closer with a radial velocity of −20 km/s.

The variable nature of the velocity for 49 Librae was first noted by W. S. Adams in 1924. The primary component has a stellar classification of F8 V or F9 V, indicating it is an F-type main-sequence star. It has an estimated 1.4 times the mass of the Sun, while the companion only has 0.4 solar masses. The system is a source for radio and X-ray emissions, which may be coming from the secondary companion.

References

F-type main-sequence stars
Spectroscopic binaries

Libra (constellation)
Durchmusterung objects
Librae, 49
3931
143333
078400
5954